Centrum Schwule Geschichte e. V. (meaning: Gay History Centre), abbreviated CSG, is a German "LGBT" organization based in Cologne (Köln).

CSG maintains a publicly open library and archive, both relating to the history of homosexuality and activism in Germany, with a focus on the homosexual subcultures of Cologne and the Rhineland. Historic documents reach back as far as the 1230s, but it has a more comprehensive inventory on magazines and other publications from the 20th century. Centrum Schwule Geschichte also organizes exhibitions, lectures and other presentations, while CSG's work has also been published in books and magazines. Invertito - Jahrbuch für die Geschichte der Homosexualitäten (Annual For The History Of Homosexualities) is co-owned by the organization.

The organisation was established in 1984 and maintains an office in the district of Kalk; its predecessor were the Rheinisches Schwulenarchiv and the Arbeitskreis schwule Geschichte.

Exhibitions

Permanent Exhibition 
 Himmel und Hölle. 100 Jahre schwul in Köln permanent exhibition since 2005; vernissage on 27. June 2002 im conjunction with Europride 2002

Temporary Exhibitions 
 Aufklärung und Aufregung - 50 Jahre Schwule und Lesben in der BRAVO., 2010
 Anders als die Andern. Schwule und Lesben in Köln und Umgebung 1895-1918, 2007 at the University of Cologne
 Troubles in Paradise. 30 Jahre Schwulen- und Lesbenzentren in Köln, 2005
 Phönix in Asche. Fotografien von Hans-Jürgen Esch, 2003
 Hannes Steinert: "Das Glück ist ein Augenblick" Art exhibition, 2002.
 Aufgespießt ... Homosexualität in der Karikatur, 2002
 Volksaufklärung per Verlagspolitik. Max Spohr (1850-1905), Verleger in Leipzig, 2001
 Gegen die Regeln. Lesben und Schwule im Sport., 2000 at Deutsches Sport- und Olympiamuseum
 Registriert. Polizei und Homosexuelle, 2000
 St. Sebastian oder Die schwule Kunst zu leiden, 1999
 Who Cares? Patrick Hamm: Video Stills, 1999
 Poster, Posen, Pornos. Zum homosexuellen Männerbild 1945 bis 1998, 1998
 Die Harten und die Zarten. Die Darstellung von Homosexualität im Film, 1998
 "Das sind Volksfeinde!" Kölner Sonderaktion gegen Homosexuelle im Sommer 1938, 1998 at EL-DE-Haus (NS-Dokumentationszentrum)
 Enthüllungen! Die 1. Kölner Reliquienausstellung aus über 2000 Jahren schwuler Geschichte, 1995
 "Verführte Männer." Das Leben der Kölner Homosexuellen im Dritten Reich, 1991
 Dornröschen. Das Leben der "Verzauberten" im Köln der 20er Jahre, 1987 at Kölner Schwulen- und Lesbenzentrum.

Publications 
 C. Limpricht/J. Müller/N. Oxenius (Hg.): Verführte Männer. Das Leben der Kölner Homosexuellen im Dritten Reich, Emons Verlag, Köln 1991, 
 K. Balser/M. Kramp/J. Müller/J. Gotzmann (Hg.): Himmel und Hölle. Das Leben der Kölner Homosexuellen 1945 bis 1969, Emons-Verlag, Köln 1994, 
 J. Müller/W. Berude (Hg.): Das sind Volksfeinde. Die Verfolgung von Homosexuellen an Rhein und Ruhr von 1933 bis 1945, Emons-Verlag, Köln 1998, 
 E. In het Panhuis: Die Harten und die Zarten. Homosexualität im Film, Köln 1998
 E. In het Panhuis / H. Potthoff: St. Sebastian oder Die schwule Kunst zu leiden, Köln 1999
 E. In het Panhuis: Anders als die Andern. Schwule und Lesben in Köln und Umgebung 1895-1918, Emons Verlag, Köln 2006, 
 E. In het Panhuis: Aufklärung und Aufregung - 50 Jahre Schwule und Lesben in der BRAVO, Archiv der Jugendkulturen Verlag KG, Berlin 2010,

See also 

 Cologne Pride
 Timeline of LGBT history
 Schwules Museum Berlin
 IHLIA LGBT Heritagein Amsterdam, the Netherlands

References

External links 
 CSG Köln (mostly German, some information available in English)
 Invertito - Jahrbuch für die Geschichte der Homosexualitäten (Annual For The History Of Homosexualities) by FHG e.V. (German and English)

LGBT museums and archives
LGBT organisations in Germany
LGBT culture in Germany
LGBT history in Germany
Organizations established in 1984
Organisations based in Cologne
Kalk, Cologne
History of Cologne
Culture in Cologne
1984 establishments in Germany